Bull Run is a  long 3rd order tributary to the Deep River in Guilford County, North Carolina.

Course
Bull Run rises in a pond about 1 mile west of Greensboro, North Carolina in Guilford County and then flows southwest to join the Deep River about 0.1 miles southwest of Oakdale, North Carolina.

Watershed
Bull Run drains  of area, receives about 45.5 in/year of precipitation, and has a wetness index of 417.65 and is about 22% forested.

See also
List of rivers of North Carolina

References

Rivers of North Carolina
Rivers of Guilford County, North Carolina